Tityus is a large genus of thick-tailed scorpions (family Buthidae), the namesake of its subfamily Tityinae. As of 2021, Tityus contains more than 220 described species distributed in Central America and South America, from Costa Rica to Argentina. Species in the genus Tityus have been studied for hundreds of years, long before the taxonomic classification was put in place. Tityus tend to be of medium size for scorpions, roughly 50 to 70 millimeters long.  They are dark brown or red in color, and can exhibit sexual dimorphism. They can live in a variety of environments, ranging from urban to arid mountains to the Amazon Rainforest. Tityus scorpions are best known for their venom and potent sting. The genus contains several dangerously venomous scorpions, the best known of which is the Brazilian yellow scorpion, T. serrulatus. Its venom can cause severe illness (including pancreatitis), and in the young, old and infirm even death. Some experts have argued that the genus as a whole may be paraphyletic, which could explain the knowledge gaps related to Tityus.

Geography 
Scorpions in the genus Tityus can live in several distinct environments across South America. However, there appears to be a clear geographic distinction that exists between species. A species that inhabits the Andes Mountains will not also live in the Amazon Rainforest. In some South American countries, such as Argentina, the geographic range of Tityus scorpions is expanding. This creates a problem for the general public and healthcare. When scorpion stings become more frequent, it puts more strain on hospitals and healthcare facilities.

Venom 
The genus Tityus is most well known for its venomous species. Tityus serrulatus venom contains a powerful neurotoxin that affects almost all anatomical body systems. The most dangerous species in the genus Tityus is serrulatus. The nature of their venom and its ability to impact the entire body make Tityus serrulatus a particularly dangerous species. However, their stings are not often lethal, may be due to low venom mass injected.  Young children and seniors are at a higher risk of death than the general population. Many factors are important for determining how dangerous a scorpion sting will be. Variables such as venom composition, location of the sting, and the overall health makeup of the victim in question play a role in determining the lethality of a sting. Scorpion stings are the most common cause of envenomation in Brazil, and are seen as a risk in urban environments.   Scorpions in the genus Tityus have been studied by medical researchers for the purpose of identifying and understanding the toxins produced by various species.

Behavior 
Little is known and fully understood about scorpion behavior in the genus Tityus. This is especially true regarding reproduction. However, several species of Tityus (including Tityus serrulatus) is parthenogenic. Scorpions are oviparous, which means they lay eggs. Parthenogenesis is the process of laying unfertilized eggs. This survival strategy may contribute to their success in a variety of environments. It is believed that females use a form of chemical communication to induce male courtship. After being exposed to compounds associated with female scorpions, male scorpions will alter their behavior and perform behaviors characteristic of courtship. Tityus scorpions use their stingers for defense, which is a behavior demonstrated by both sexes. Venom is energetically expensive to create, so scorpions only use their stinger when seriously threatened.

Diet 
Scorpions in the genus Tityus are carnivores. They feed on insects such as cockroaches and crickets. It is believed that members of the genus Tityus can survive for over a year without food, and even give birth after lengthy periods of starvation. This is another survival technique that helps them outlast unfavorable conditions.

Species

Tityus aba Candido, Lucas, de Souza, Diaz & Lira-da-Silva, 2005
Tityus abudi Armas, 1999
Tityus acananensis González-Sponga, 2009
Tityus adisi Lourenço, 2002
Tityus adrianoi Lourenço, 2003
Tityus ahincoi González-Sponga, 2001
Tityus altithronus Armas, 1999
Tityus anasilviae Armas & Abud Antun, 2004
Tityus androcottoides (Karsch, 1879)
Tityus anduzei González-Sponga, 1997
Tityus angelesae Santiago-Blay, 2009
Tityus anneae Lourenço, 1997
Tityus antioquensis Lourenço & Otero Patiño, 1998
Tityus apiacas Lourenço,2002
Tityus apozonalli Riquelme, Villegas & González, 2015
Tityus arellanoparrai González-Sponga, 1985
Tityus argentinus Borelli, 1899
Tityus asthenes Pocock, 1893
Tityus atriventer Pocock, 1897
Tityus bahiensis (Perty, 1833)
Tityus bahoruco Teruel & Armas, 2006
Tityus barquisimetanus González-Sponga, 1994
Tityus bastosi Lourenço, 1984
Tityus bellulus Armas, 1999
Tityus betschi Lourenço, 1992
Tityus birabeni Abalos, 1955
Tityus blanci Lourenço, 1994
Tityus blaseri Mello-Leitão, 1931
Tityus boconoensis González-Sponga, 1981
Tityus bolivanus Kraepelin, 1895
Tityus brazilae Lourenço & Eickstedt, 1984
Tityus breweri González-Sponga, 1997
Tityus cachipalensis González-Sponga, 2002
Tityus caesarbarrioi González-Sponga, 2001
Tityus canopensis Lourenço, 2002
Tityus carabobensis González-Sponga, 1987
Tityus carinatoides Mello-Leitão, 1945
Tityus caripitensis Quiroga, deSousa & Parrilla-Alvarez, 2000
Tityus carvalhoi Mello-Leitão, 1945
Tityus cerroazul Lourenço, 1986
Tityus championi Pocock, 1898
Tityus charalaensis Mello-Leitão, 1940
Tityus charreyroni Vellard, 1932
Tityus chilensis Lourenço, 2005
Tityus cisandinus Lourenço & Ythier, 2017
Tityus clathratus C. L. Koch, 1844
Tityus columbianus (Thorell, 1876)
Tityus confluens Borelli, 1899
Tityus costatus (Karsch, 1879)
Tityus crassicauda (Lourenço, 2013)
Tityus crassimanus (Thorell, 1876)
Tityus cuellari Lourenço, 1994
Tityus culebrensis González-Sponga, 1994
Tityus cylindricus (Karsch, 1879)
Tityus dasyurus Pocock, 1897
Tityus dedoslargos Francke & Stockwell, 1987
Tityus demangei Lourenço, 1981
Tityus dinizi Lourenço, 1997
Tityus discrepans (Karsch, 1879)
Tityus dorae González-Sponga, 2001
Tityus duacaensis González-Sponga, 2007
Tityus dulceae González-Sponga, 2006
Tityus dupouyi González-Sponga, 1987
Tityus ebanoverde Armas, 1999
Tityus ecuadorensis Kraepelin, 1896
Tityus elii (Armas & Marcano Fondeur, 1992)
Tityus elizabethae Lourenço & Ramos, 2004
Tityus elizabethebravoi González-Sponga & Wall Gonzalez, 2007
Tityus engelkei Pocock, 1902
Tityus estherae Santiago-Blay, 2009
Tityus evandroi Mello-Leitão, 1945
† Tityus exstinctus Lourenço, 1995
Tityus fasciolatus Pessôa, 1935
Tityus festae Borelli, 1899
Tityus filodendron González-Sponga, 1981
Tityus florezi Lourenço, 2000
Tityus footei Chamberlin, 1916
Tityus forcipula (Gervais, 1843)
Tityus fuhrmanni Kraepelin, 1914
Tityus funestus Hirst, 1911
Tityus gaffini Lourenço, 2000
Tityus gasci Lourenço, 1982
Tityus gonzalespongai Quiroga, de Sousa, Parrilla-Alvarez & Manzanilla, 2004
Tityus guaricoensis Gonzalez-Sponga, 2004
Tityus horacioi Lourenço & Leguin, 2011
Tityus imei Borges, de Sousa & Manzanilla, 2006
Tityus indecisus Mello-Leitão, 1934
Tityus insignis (Pocock, 1889)
Tityus intermedius Borelli, 1899
Tityus irapaensis González-Sponga, 2002
Tityus isabelceciliae González-Sponga, D'Suze & Sevcik, 2001
Tityus ivani González-Sponga, 2008
Tityus ivicnancor González-Sponga, 1997
Tityus jeanvellardi Lourenço, 2001
Tityus julianae Lourenço, 2005
Tityus juliorum Santiago-Blay, 2009
Tityus jussarae Lourenço, 1988
Tityus kaderkai Kovarik, 2005
Tityus kalettai González-Sponga, 2007
Tityus kukututee Ythier, Chevalier & Gangadin, 2020
Tityus kuryi Lourenço, 1997
Tityus lancinii González-Sponga, 1972
Tityus lokiae Lourenço, 2005
Tityus longidigitus González-Sponga, 2008
Tityus lourencoi Flórez, 1996
Tityus lutzi Giltay, 1928
Tityus macrochirus Pocock, 1897
Tityus magnimanus Pocock, 1897
Tityus maimirensis González-Sponga, 2007
Tityus manakai González-Sponga, 2004
Tityus maniapurensis González-Sponga, 2009
Tityus marajoensis Lourenço & da Silva, 2007
Tityus maranhensis Lourenço, de Jesus Junior & Limeira-de-Oliveira, 2006
Tityus martinpaechi Lourenço, 2001
Tityus matthieseni Lourenço & Pinto-da-Rocha, 2000
Tityus mattogrossensis Borelli, 1901
Tityus maturinensis González-Sponga, 2008
Tityus melanostictus Pocock, 1893
Tityus melici Lourenço, 2003
Tityus metuendus Pocock, 1897
Tityus michelii Armas, 1982
Tityus microcystis Lutz & Mello, 1922
Tityus monaguensis González-Sponga, 1974
Tityus mongei Lourenço, 1996
Tityus mucusunamensis González-Sponga, 2006
Tityus munozi Lourenço, 1997
Tityus neblina Lourenço, 2008
Tityus neglectus Mello-Leitão, 1932
Tityus neibae Armas, 1999
Tityus nelsoni Lourenço, 2005
Tityus nematochirus Mello-Leitão, 1940
Tityus neoespartanus González-Sponga, 1996
Tityus nororientalis González-Sponga, 1996
Tityus obispoi González-Sponga, 2006
Tityus obscurus (Gervais, 1843)
Tityus obtusus (Karsch, 1879)
Tityus ocelote Francke & Stockwell, 1987
Tityus osmanus González-Sponga, 1996
Tityus oteroi Lourenço, 1998
Tityus ottenwalderi Armas, 1999
Tityus pachyurus Pocock, 1897
Tityus pampanensis González-Sponga, 2007
Tityus paraguayensis Kraepelin, 1895
Tityus parvulus Kraepelin, 1914
Tityus paulistorum Lourenço & Qi, 2006
Tityus perijanensis González-Sponga, 1994
Tityus pictus Pocock, 1893
Tityus pintodarochai Lourenço, 2005
Tityus pittieri González-Sponga, 1981
Tityus pococki Hirst, 1907
Tityus portoplatensis Armas & Marcano Fondeur, 1992
Tityus potameis Lourenço & Leão Giupponi, 2004
Tityus prancei Lourenço, 2000
Tityus proseni Abalos, 1954
Tityus pugilator Pocock, 1898
Tityus pusillus Pocock, 1893
Tityus quiriquirensis González-Sponga, 2008
Tityus quirogae De Sousa, Manzanilla & Parrilla-Alvarez, 2006
Tityus quisqueyanus (Armas, 1982)
Tityus ramirezi Esquivel de Verde, 1969 [nomen dubium]
Tityus raquelae Lourenço, 1988
Tityus rebieri Lourenço, 1997
Tityus riocaurensis González-Sponga, 1996
Tityus rionegrensis Lourenço, 2006
Tityus riverai Teruel & Sanchez, 2009
Tityus roigi Maury & Lourenço, 1987
Tityus rojasi González-Sponga, 1996
Tityus romeroi González-Sponga, 2008
Tityus rondonorum Rojas-Runjaic & Armas, 2007
Tityus rufofuscus Pocock, 1897
Tityus rugosus Schenkel, 1932
Tityus rusmelyae González-Sponga, D'Suze & Sevcik, 2001
Tityus sabinae Lourenço, 1994
Tityus sanarensis González-Sponga, 1997
Tityus sanfernandoi González-Sponga, 2008
Tityus sarisarinamensis González-Sponga, 2002
Tityus sastrei Lourenço & Flórez, 1990
Tityus septentrionalis Armas & Abud Antun, 2004
Tityus serrulatus Lutz & Mello, 1922
Tityus shiriana González-Sponga, 1991
Tityus silvestris Pocock, 1897
Tityus simonsi Pocock, 1900
Tityus smithii Pocock, 1893
Tityus soratensis Kraepelin, 1912
Tityus stigmurus (Thorell, 1876)
Tityus strandi Werner, 1939
Tityus surimeridensis González-Sponga, 2002
Tityus surorientalis González-Sponga, 1996
Tityus sylviae Lourenço, 2005
Tityus tamayoi González-Sponga, 1987
Tityus tayrona Lourenço, 1991
Tityus tenuicauda Prendini, 2001
Tityus thelyacanthus Mello-Leitão, 1933
Tityus timendus Pocock, 1898
Tityus trinitatis Pocock, 1897
Tityus trivittatus Kraepelin, 1898
Tityus tucurui Lourenço, 1988
Tityus uniformis Mello-Leitão, 1931
Tityus unus Lourenço & Pinto-da-Rocha, 2000
Tityus uquirensis González-Sponga, 2001
Tityus urachichensis González-Sponga, 2007
Tityus urbinai Scorza, 1952
Tityus uruguayensis Borelli, 1901
Tityus vaissadei Lourenço, 2002
Tityus valerae Scorza, 1954
Tityus venamensis González-Sponga, 1981
Tityus ventuarensis González-Sponga, 2009
Tityus walli González-Sponga & Wall Gonzalez, 2007
Tityus wayuu Rojas-Runjaic & Armas, 2007
Tityus yerenai González-Sponga, 2009
Tityus ythieri Lourenço, 2007
Tityus zulianus González-Sponga, 1981

References

External links

Guide to dangerous scorpions

 
Scorpions of South America